Saint-Germain-de-Tallevende-la-Lande-Vaumont is a former commune in the Calvados department in the Normandy region in northwestern France. On 1 January 2016, it was merged into the new commune of Vire Normandie.

It was one of the three communes in the French Republic which have the longest name (38 letters). The other two are:
Saint-Remy-en-Bouzemont-Saint-Genest-et-Isson, Marne
Beaujeu-Saint-Vallier-Pierrejux-et-Quitteur, Haute-Saône

Population

See also
Communes of the Calvados department

References

Former communes of Calvados (department)
Calvados communes articles needing translation from French Wikipedia